Kurt is a male given name of Germanic or Turkish origin. Kurt or Curt originated as short forms of the Germanic Conrad, depending on geographical usage, with meanings including counselor or advisor. 

In Turkish, Kurt means "Wolf" and is a surname and given name in numerous Turkic countries.

Curt
 Curt Casali (born 1988), American baseball catcher for the San Francisco Giants
 Curt Gowdy (1919–2006), American sportscaster
 Curt Hasler (born 1964), American baseball coach
 Curt Hennig (1958–2003), American professional wrestler
 Curd Jürgens (1915–1982), German-Austrian actor
 Wolf Curt von Schierbrand (1807–1888), German zoologist
 Curt Schilling (born 1966), American baseball player
 Curt Sjöö (born 1937), Swedish Army lieutenant general
 Curt Smith (born 1961), British musician, member of Tears for Fears
 Curt Stone (1922–2021), American long-distance runner
 Curtis Stone (born 1975), Australian chef and TV personality
 Curt Westberg (born 1943), Swedish Air Force major general
 Curt Wittenberg, American biologist

Kurt 
 Kurt Angle (born 1968), American wrestler
 Kurt Asle Arvesen (born 1975), Norwegian racing cyclist
 Kurt Ballou (born 1974), American guitarist and producer 
 Kurt Barling (born 1961), British professor of journalism
 Kurt Beck (born 1949), German politician (SPD)
 Kurt Benkert (born 1995), American football player
 Kurt Bevacqua (born 1947), American baseball player
 Kurt Biedenkopf (1930–2021), German politician (CDU)
 Kurt Browning (born 1966), Canadian figure-skater
 Kurt Burnette (born 1955), American Ruthenian Catholic bishop of the Eparchy of Passaic
 Kurt Busch (born 1978), American NASCAR driver
 Kurt Cobain (1967–1994), American musician, frontman of the band Nirvana
 Kurt Daluege (1897–1946), German SS general and police official
 Kurt Damrow (born 1962), American politician
 Kurt Darren, South African Afrikaans singer
Kurt Demmler (1943–2009), German songwriter; accused of sexual abuse he hanged himself in his jail cell
 Kurt Epstein (1904–1975), Czechoslovakian Olympic water polo player
 Kurt Equiluz (1929–2022), Austrian classical tenor in opera and concert
 Kurt Gerstein, German SS officer and member of Waffen-SS
 Kurt Gödel (1906–1978), German mathematician
 Kurt Großkurth (1909–1975), German actor and singer
 Kurt Hahn (1886–1974), German educator, creator of Outward Bound
 Kurt Hamrin (born 1934), Swedish football player
 Kurt Heegner (1893–1965), German mathematician
 Kurt Hensel (1861–1941), German mathematician
 Kurt Hinish (born 1999), American football player
 Kurt James (born 1972), American musician
 Kurt Jara (born 1950), Austrian football player and coach
 Kurt Kafentzis (born 1962), American football player
 Kurt Georg Kiesinger (1904–1988), German politician, Chancellor of West Germany 1966–1969
 Kurt Krenn (1936–2014), Austrian bishop
 Kurt (Kubrat) (632–665 AD), Bulgar statesman
 Kurt Kuenne (born 1973), American filmmaker, known for the documentary Dear Zachary
 Kurt Lamm (1919–1987), German-born American soccer player, coach, manager, and administrator
 Kurt Loder (born 1945), American media correspondent
 Kurt Looby (born 1984), Antiguan basketball player
 Kurt Mann (born 1993), Australian rugby league project
 Kurt Masur (1927–2015), German conductor
 Kurt Meyer (1910–1961), German commander
 Kurt Mørkøre (born 1969), Faroese footballer
 Kurt Nilsen (born 1978), Norwegian singer
 Kurt Pompe (1899–1964), German Nazi SS concentration camp commandant
 Kurt Rambis (born 1958), Greek-American basketball coach and former player 
 Kurt Reidemeister (1893–1971), German mathematician
 Kurt Roberts (born 1988), American shot putter
 Kurt Russell (born 1951), American actor
 Kurt von Schleicher (1882–1934), German general and politician, Chancellor of Germany 1932–1933
 Kurt Fritz Schneider (1902–1985), German circus performer in the USA
 Kurt Hugo Schneider (born 1988), also known as KHS, American film director, producer, singer and songwriter
 Kurt Schneider (1887–1967), German psychiatrist
 Kurt Schneider (aviator) (1888–1917), German World War I flying ace
 Kurt Schneider (athlete) (1900–1988), German athlete
 Kurt Schwitters (1887–1948), German painter
 Kurt Sinette (born 1974), Trinidad and Tobago boxer
 Kurt Spenrath (born 1976), Canadian filmmaker
 Kurt Stettler (1932–2020), Swiss footballer
 Kurt Student (1890–1978), German air force general
 Kurt Suzuki (born 1983), American baseball player
 Kurt Tucholsky (1890–1935), German journalist
 Kurt Vile (born 1980), American singer and songwriter
 Kurt Vonnegut (1922–2007), American writer
 Kurt Voss (born 1963), American film director
 Kurt Waldheim (1918–2007), Austrian politician, UN Secretary General 1972–1981, convicted Nazi war criminal
 Kurt Warburton, English mixed martial arts fighter 
 Kurt Warner (born 1971), retired American football player
 Kurt Weill (1900–1950), German-American composer
 Kurt Westergaard (1935–2021), Danish cartoonist
 Kurt Wolff (aviator) (1895–1917), German flying ace
 Kurt Wolff (publisher) (1887–1963), German publisher
 Kurt Wubben (born 1972), Dutch marathon ice speed skater
 Kurt Zouma (born 1994), French footballer

Fictional characters
 Curt Wild, in the movie Velvet Goldmine
 Colonel Kurt Von Strohm, in the BBC sitcom 'Allo 'Allo!
 Kurt-051, in the novel Halo: Ghosts of Onyx
 Kurt Dierker, from the game The Saboteur
 Kurt Frank, a survivor in the video game Identity V
 Kurt Hummel, in the TV series Glee
 Kurt von Trapp, in the musical The Sound of Music
 Kurt Wylde, in the movie Hot Wheels: World Race and the movie series Hot Wheels: AcceleRacers
 Kurt Wagner (comics), also known as Nightcrawler, Marvel comic book superhero
 Kurt Wallander, detective in the works of Henning Mankell
 Kurt Kelly, a jock from the movie Heathers and its musical and TV series adaptations
 Kurt Kunkle, main character and killer in the movie Spree (film)
 Dwight Kurt Schrute III, from the American TV series The Office

References

English masculine given names
Danish masculine given names
German masculine given names
Norwegian masculine given names
Swedish masculine given names
Scandinavian masculine given names